Xestia dolosa, known by the names greater black-letter dart, woodland spotted cutworm and spotted cutworm is a moth of the family Noctuidae (Note that the common name spotted cutworm is also used for larvae of Xestia c-nigrum). It is found from New Brunswick and Prince Edward Island to Florida west to Texas, north to North Dakota and Manitoba.

This wingspan is about 40 mm. The moth flies from May to October in two generations in the South and from July to August in one generation in the North.

The larva feeds on various crop plants, including barley, clovers, corn, tobacco as well as apple and maples.

External links
butterfliesandmoths.org
Species info

Xestia
Moths of North America
Moths described in 1980